Fredrik Olof Johan ("Figge") Norling (born 1 May 1965 in Lycksele, Sweden) is a Swedish actor and theatre director. He has been married to the actress Tova Magnusson Norling. He is best known for being the voice for Emperor Kuzco from the swedish dub of The Emperor's New Groove.

Norling was educated at the Swedish National Academy of Mime and Acting in Stockholm. He has been engaged at Riksteatern, the Royal Dramatic Theatre, the Boulevard Theatre and Intiman. His voice is best known from SR's program Clownen luktar bensin, where he also was active as screenwriter.

Filmography
Wallander – Prästen (2009)
 2008 – Skägget i brevlådan (active as storyteller)
 2007 – Isprinsessan
 2004 – Miss Sweden
Puder (2001)
The Emperor's New Groove (2000)
Naken (2000)
 1998 – Vita lögner
Beck – Mannen med ikonerna (1997)
Beck – Lockpojken (1997)
 1996 – Anna Holt
Drömprinsen - Filmen om Em (1996)
 1995 – Radioskugga
Svart Lucia (1992)
 1990 – Apelsinmannen

References

External links

1965 births
Living people
Swedish screenwriters
Swedish male screenwriters
People from Lycksele Municipality
Swedish film directors
Swedish male actors